The 1909 Tennessee Volunteers football team represented the University of Tennessee in the 1909 college football season.  The Volunteers went 1–6–2, their worst season since 1906, when they compiled the same record.  George Levene served the final year of his three-year tenure as head coach.

Schedule

References

Tennessee
Tennessee Volunteers football seasons
Tennessee Volunteers football